Gigmoto, officially the Municipality of Gigmoto,  is a 5th class municipality in the province of Catanduanes, Philippines. According to the 2020 census, it has a population of 8,712 people.

History

The name "Gigmoto" originated from the Bicol word himbot that means “just in time”. This is supposedly related to the romantic venture of a young man from Baras seeking to court a maiden from the town of Viga. Competing with several other suitors, the man traveled northbound to win the love of the maiden. He was overtaken by the night, so he slept in that place. In the morning he proceeded to Viga, arriving there just before nightfall. After staying for a period of time in Viga, the man from Baras won the heart of the woman. When the lovers were bound for Baras, they stayed overnight at Gigmoto – “just in time” for their first romantic night of being together.

As years went by Himbotan was changed to Higmoto. Years thereafter, believing that with the “H” Higmoto seemed to be a Japanese word, the “H” was changed to “G” – thus the name Gigmoto.

The first families to settle there were the Tanaels, followed by the Dayawons, both from Baras. The Tolledos, the Tatings and the Tatads came next. Other families from Baras, Bato and from the town of Virac had come and ultimately made Gigmoto the biggest barrio of the Municipality of Baras.

The town was created from the barrios of Sicmil and Sioron from Viga and the barrios of San Vicente, Gigmoto, Biong and Dororian from Baras.

On June 15, 1951, the government officials for the newly created town were appointed by the then Congressman Severiano de Leon who authored the bill creating the municipality with the approval of President Elpidio Quirino. Mr. Juan Q. Sarmiento who happened to be the first public school teacher became the first mayor with Andres Dayawon as Vice Mayor. Messrs. Maximo Tapalla, Apolinar Tatad, Marcelino Dayawon and Apolinar Joson were then appointed municipal councilors. Mr. Candido Tuboro became the first municipal treasurer. Fr. Andres Tablizo was the parish priest and Mr. Serafin Rodulfo was the first principal.

Geography

Barangays
Gigmoto is politically subdivided into 9 barangays.
 Biong
 Dororian
 Poblacion District I
 Poblacion District II
 Poblacion District III
 San Pedro
 San Vicente
 Sicmil
 Sioron

Climate

Gigmoto has a tropical rainforest climate (Af) with heavy to very heavy rainfall year-round and with extremely heavy rainfall from October to December.

Demographics

Economy

Gallery

References

External links

 [ Philippine Standard Geographic Code]
Philippine Census Information

Municipalities of Catanduanes